Chung Wan may refer to:
Central, Hong Kong Island, Hong Kong
 Chung Wan constituency of the Central and Western District Council
Chung Wan, Crooked Island, New Territories, Hong Kong
Chung Wan, Lai Chi Wo, New Territories, Hong Kong

See also
Middle Bay (disambiguation)